Henry Read McIlwaine (1864–1934) was an American editor and librarian. He served as the third State Librarian for the Commonwealth of Virginia.

Biography
Henry Read McIlwaine was born in Farmville, Virginia on July 12, 1864.

McIlwaine graduated from Hampden-Sydney College in 1885 and earned a Ph.D. from Johns Hopkins University in 1893. He returned to Hampden–Sydney in 1893 to serve as professor of English and history until 1907, when he was appointed State Librarian for Virginia, a position he held until his death in Richmond on March 16, 1934.

He was a prolific editor of historical volumes relating to the early governance of the Commonwealth including:
Executive Journals of the Council of Colonial Virginia
Journals of the House of Burgesses of Virginia
Legislative journals of the Council of colonial Virginia
Official letters of the governors of the State of Virginia
The struggle of Protestant dissenters for religious toleration in Virginia

See also
Library science
Library of Virginia

References

American librarians
1864 births
1934 deaths